The Public Credit Act of 1869 in the USA states that bondholders who purchased bonds to help finance the Civil War (1861 – 1865) would be paid back in gold. The act was signed on March 18, 1869, and was mainly supported by the Republican Party, notably Senator John Sherman.

Background
Prior to the Civil War, the U.S. operated on a gold standard in practice. Bank notes were legal tender issued by state banks which could be exchanged for an amount of gold at any bank. Both gold and bank notes circulated as mediums of exchange. On February 25, 1862, the U.S. passed the First Legal Tender Act to help finance the Civil War. The act changed the economy to a fiduciary standard based on a fiat currency called United States Notes, or more popularly, greenbacks. Unlike bank notes, greenbacks were not backed by any metallic standard and functioned as a "loan without interest." Greenbacks were issued as an immediate, short-term relief for the country's growing demand for currency. The issuance of greenbacks and the sale of government bonds to finance the war were led by the Secretary of the Treasury at the time, Salmon P. Chase. Until 1879, gold, bank notes, and greenbacks were used as mediums of exchange and had free floating exchange rates.

After the Civil War, there was debate over whether to keep the greenback standard or to revert to the gold standard. During the Civil War, the nation experienced a strong period of inflation. The price level in the U.S. almost doubled between 1861 and 1865, with harmful implications on the exchange rate. Inflation increased the exchange rate with England, making the price of British pounds more expensive. There was concern that if the pre-war gold standard was put in place during this inflationary period, people would cash out their U.S. currency for gold to buy British goods. The flow of gold out of the country would slow the economy and lead to unemployment.

Some Republicans pushed for a gold standard early on. They believed that creditors who supported the war should be paid back in gold, the way they were expected to be paid back. The Republicans also believed that the government should not be in charge of managing currency and that the gold standard did not allow government to intervene in the economy. It was thought by all that the gold standard would also be a good move from an international perspective, since the U.S. would appear stable, and its system would be compatible with its major trading partner, England, who also operated on a gold standard.

Consequences
Over time, the price level and exchange rate began to fall. Congress decided on a severe monetary contraction to lower the price level so they could reinstate the gold standard during the Contraction Act of 1866 before easing the policy in 1868. The passing of the Public Credit Act of 1869 was the first definitive piece of legislation that moved the U.S. toward reinstating a gold standard. However, the act included no explicit dates, people, or actions intended to pay back the bondholders in gold. The U.S. did not officially operate on the gold standard again until the Resumption Act of 1875.

See also
Contraction Act of 1866
John Sherman
Gold Standard
Salmon P. Chase
Resumption Act

References

Ulysses S. Grant Interpretive Outline by Frank Scaturro of the Grant Monument Association 
Act To Strengthen The Public Credit– March 18, 1869, HistoryCentral.com, histories home on the web
Act to Strengthen The Public Credit – March 18, 1869. History Central, 2000. http://www.historycentral.com/documents/Publiccredit.html  March 13, 2011
Friedman, Milton, and Anna J. Schwartz. A Monetary History of the United States, 1867 – 1960. National Bureau of Economic Research. Princeton, N.J.: Princeton University Press, 1963.
Kindahl, James K. "Economic Factors in Specie Resumption the United States, 1865-79." The Journal of Political Economy Vol. 69, No. 1 (Feb., 1961), pp. 30–48
Smith, Gregor W. and R. Todd Smith. "Greenback-Gold Returns and Expectations of Resumption, 1862-1879." The Journal of Economic History Vol. 57, No. 3 (Sep., 1997), pp. 697–717
Walton, Gary M, and Hugh Rockoff. History of the American Economy. 11th ed. Mason, Ohio: Thomson/South-Western, 2010.

1869 in American law
United States federal currency legislation